Meyer Landsberg (May 1, 1810 – May 20, 1870) was a German rabbi.

Biography
Landsberg's teacher, Aaron Wolfsohn, rabbi of Wöllstein, was elected to the rabbinate of Hildesheim in 1826, and Landsberg accompanied him and lived under his roof until Wolfsohn's death in 1830. Landsberg then went to Brunswick, where he continued his rabbinical studies while preparing for the university at the Brunswick gymnasium. He studied at the University of Berlin from 1834 to 1838. At Berlin he became closely connected with Leopold Zunz; with him he organized the Seminary for Jewish Teachers in 1840, in which institution he was an instructor until 1845. A lifelong friendship with Zunz was established, with whom he corresponded until his death.

In 1835 Landsberg was engaged as teacher at the Nauensche Institute for the education of boys, and from 1839 to 1846 he was its director, in which position David Cassel was his successor. From 1838 to 1846 he preached regularly at the bet ha-midrash and at the synagogue of Commerzienrath Lieberman. In 1846 he was appointed Landesrabbiner of Hildesheim, which position he filled until his death.

Although himself very strict in the observance of the ceremonial law, he was of a progressive spirit. In the synagogue built during his administration (1849) an organ was introduced, a mixed choir established, some German prayers introduced, and the piyyuṭim nearly all abolished. Confirmations of boys and girls were held every year.

Personal life
Landsberg's eldest son was Dr. Max Landsberg, rabbi at Rochester, New York. His second son was architectural scholar  of the Technische Hochschule at Darmstadt.

References

1810 births
1870 deaths
19th-century German rabbis
Humboldt University of Berlin alumni
People from Hildesheim
People from Międzyrzecz